The National Palace Museum, is a museum in Taipei, Republic of China (Taiwan). It has a permanent collection of nearly 700,000 pieces of Chinese artifacts and artworks, many of which were moved from the Palace Museum in the Forbidden City in Beijing, as well as five other institutions throughout mainland China during the ROC retreat. These collections had been transferred to several locations before finally being established in 1965 at its present location in Shilin, Taipei. The museum building itself was built between March 1964 and August 1965, with many subsequent expansions making it one of the largest of its type in the world. There is also a Southern Branch in Taibao, Chiayi which opened in 2015.

The museum's collection encompasses items spanning 8,000 years of Chinese history from the neolithic age to the modern period. The National Palace Museum shares its roots with the Palace Museum of Beijing, whose extensive collection of artwork and artifacts were built upon the imperial collections of the Ming and Qing dynasties.

History

Establishment in Beijing and relocation

The National Palace Museum was originally established as the Palace Museum in the Forbidden City on 10 October 1925, shortly after the expulsion of Puyi, the last emperor of China, from the Forbidden City by warlord Feng Yuxiang. The articles in the museum consisted of the valuables of the former imperial family.

In 1931, shortly after the Mukden Incident Generalissimo Chiang Kai-shek's Nationalist Government ordered the museum to make preparations to evacuate its most valuable pieces out of the city to prevent them from falling into the hands of the Imperial Japanese Army. As a result, from 6 February to 15 May 1933, the Palace Museum's 13,491 crates and 6,066 crates of objects from the Exhibition Office of Ancient Artifacts, the Summer Palace and the Imperial Hanlin Academy were moved in five groups to Shanghai. In 1936, the collection was moved to Nanking after the construction of the storage in the Taoist monastery Chaotian Palace was complete. As the Imperial Japanese Army advanced farther inland during the Second Sino-Japanese War, which merged into the greater conflict of World War II, the collection was moved westward via three routes to several places including Anshun and Leshan until the surrender of Japan in 1945. In 1947, it was shipped back to the Nanjing warehouse.

Evacuation to Taiwan

The Chinese Civil War resumed following the surrender of the Japanese, ultimately resulting in Generalissimo Chiang Kai-shek's decision to evacuate the arts to Taiwan, which had been handed over to the ROC in 1945. When the fighting worsened in 1948 between the Communist and Nationalist armies, the National Beijing Palace Museum and other five institutions made the decision to send some of the most prized items to Taiwan. Hang Li-wu, later director of the museum, supervised the transport of some of the collection in three groups from Nanking to the harbor in Keelung, Taiwan between December 1948 and February 1949. By the time the items arrived in Taiwan, the Communist army had already seized control of the National Beijing Palace Museum collection, so not all of the collection could be sent to Taiwan. A total of 2,972 crates of artifacts from the Forbidden City moved to Taiwan accounted for only 22% of the crates originally transported south, although the pieces represented some of the very best of the collection.

Joint Managerial Office in Taichung
The collection from the National Beijing Palace Museum, the Preparatory Office of the National Central Museum, the National Central Library, and the National Beijing Library was stored in a railway warehouse in Yangmei following transport across the Taiwan Strait and was later moved to storage in a cane sugar mill near Taichung. In 1949, the Executive Yuan created the Joint Managerial Office for the National Beijing Palace Museum, the Preparatory Office of the National Central Museum, and the National Central Library, to oversee the organization of the collection. For security reasons, the Joint Managerial Office chose the mountain village of Beigou, located in Wufeng, Taichung, as the new storage site for the collection. The following year, the collection stored at the cane sugar mill was transported to the new site in Beigou.

With the National Central Library's reinstatement in 1955, the collection from the National Beijing Library was simultaneously incorporated into the National Central Library. The Joint Managerial Office of the National Beijing Palace Museum and the Preparatory Office of the National Central Museum stayed in Beigou for another ten years. During the decade, the office obtained a grant from the Asia Foundation to construct a small-scale exhibition hall in the spring of 1956. The exhibition hall, opened in March 1957, was divided into four galleries in which it was possible to exhibit more than 200 items.

The National Palace Museum in Taipei
In the autumn of 1960, the office received a grant of NT$32 million from AID. The Republic of China (ROC) government also contributed more than NT$30 million to establish a special fund for the construction of a museum in the Taipei suburb of Waishuanxi. The construction of the museum in Waishuanxi was completed in August 1965. The new museum site was christened the "Chung-Shan Museum" in honor of the founding father of the ROC, Sun Yat-sen, and first opened to the public on the centenary of Sun Yat-sen's birthday. Since then, the museum in Taipei has managed, conserved and exhibited the collections of the National Beijing Palace Museum and the Preparatory Office of the National Central Museum.

Trivia
A number of Chinese artifacts dating from the Tang and Song dynasties, some of which had been owned by Emperor Zhenzong, were excavated and then came into the hands of the Kuomintang General Ma Hongkui, who refused to publicize the findings. Among the artifacts were a white marble tablet from the Tang dynasty, gold nails, and bands made out of metal. It was not until after Ma died that his wife went to Taiwan in 1971 from America to bring the artifacts to Chiang Kai-shek, who turned them over to the National Palace Museum.

In August 2022, PLA drills around Taiwan raised concern over the potential safety of the museum's artifacts. Former director Chou Kung-shin suggested creating a plan to store them in the mountain tunnels nearby. When they were originally shipped into Taiwan, the artifacts were stored in tunnels in Taichung during the 1950s before being moved to Taipei, where the museum was eventually built.

In October 2022, it was revealed that three artefacts from the Ming and Qing dynasties, reportedly worth a US$77 million, had been damaged. In response to inquiries, the museum admitted that two teacups were found broken in February and April that year, and a plate was dropped in May. Director Wu Mi-cha suspected that the teacups might have been damaged due to unsatisfactory storage practices, which the museum is working to improve.

Relations with the PRC
During the 1960s and 1970s, the National Palace Museum was used by the Kuomintang to support its claim that the Republic of China was the sole legitimate government of all China, in that it was the sole preserver of traditional Chinese culture amid social change and the Cultural Revolution in mainland China, and tended to emphasize Chinese nationalism.

The People's Republic of China (PRC) government has long said that the collection was stolen and that it legitimately belongs in China, but Taiwan has defended its collection as a necessary act to protect the pieces from destruction, especially during the Cultural Revolution. However, relations regarding this treasure have warmed in recent years and the Palace Museum in Beijing has agreed to lend relics to the National Palace Museum for exhibitions since 2009. The Palace Museum curator Zheng Xinmiao has said that the artifacts in both mainland and Taiwan museums are "China's cultural heritage jointly owned by people across the Taiwan Strait."

Museum building

Northern Branch
The National Palace Museum's main building in Taipei was designed by Huang Baoyu and constructed from March 1964 to August 1965. Due to the insufficient space to put on display over 600,000 artifacts, the museum underwent expansions in 1967, 1970, 1984 and 1996. In 2002, the museum underwent a major US$21 million renovation revamping the museum to make it more spacious and modern. The renovation closed about two-thirds of the museum section and the museum officially reopened in February 2007.

Permanent exhibitions of painting and calligraphy are rotated once every three months. Approximately 3,000 pieces of the museum's collection can be viewed at a given time. Although brief, these exhibitions are extremely popular. In 2014, the museum organized the top three best-attended exhibitions worldwide, including paintings and calligraphic works by Tang Yin, as well as depictions of the Qing dynasty's Qianlong Emperor reinterpreted by contemporary artists.

Southern Branch

There is also a lake and Asian style garden on the grounds. Planning for the southern branch began in 2000. The building was to be designed by architect Antoine Predock and began construction in 2005. However, due to serious construction delays and disputes between the contractors and the museum, the firm pulled out in 2008. Museum director Chou Kung-shin stated in August 2010 that new architects Kris Yao for the project would commence, with construction completed in 2015. The museum itself, 9,000 square meters in total, was designed by the Taiwan-based firm Artech Inc. and is both earthquake resistant and flood resistant. After its grand opening on 28 December 2015, the building was plagued by water leakage, which forced its closure in April 2016. The Southern Branch then reopened on 23 August 2016, after repairs to address the water leakage issues were completed.

Collections

Statistics
Complete inventory inspection has been taken three times in 1951–1954, 1989–1991 and 2008–2012 since the museum started to bring collections to Taiwan in 1948. According to official report, the museum houses Chinese calligraphy, porcelain, bronzes, paintings, jades and many other artifacts, with 22% (2,972 out of 13,491 crates) of the boxes originally transported south from the Forbidden City. Other additions include transfers from other institutions, donations, and purchases made by the museum. A large number of these artifacts were brought by Chiang Kai-shek before his Kuomintang forces fled the mainland in 1949. The museum has accumulated nearly 700,000 artifacts of significant historical or artistic values. With a collection of this size, only 1% of the collection is exhibited at any given time. The rest of the collection is stored in temperature controlled vaults.

Notable items
The museum houses several treasured items that are the pride of their collection and famous worldwide. The antiquities in the National Palace Museum span over thousands of years with a variety of genres.

Metalwork
Among the collections of bronzes, Zong Zhou Zhong (Bell of Zhou), commissioned by King Li of Zhou, is the most important musical instrument cast under his royal decree. Mao Gong Ding (Cauldron of Duke of Mao) of the late Western Zhou dynasty (1046–771 BCE) carries the longest Chinese bronze inscriptions so far extant.

Ceramics
With 21 pieces out of fewer than 80 surviving, the museum has the world's largest collection of Ru ware, one of the rarest Chinese ceramics, made exclusively for the court and one of the Five Great Kilns of the Song dynasty (960–1279), along with Ding porcelain, Jun ware, Guan and Ge; the museum has major collections of all of these. Those from the official kilns of the Ming (1368–1644) and Qing (1644–1912) dynasties, such as the doucai porcelains of the Chenghua reign during the Ming dynasty and painted enamel porcelains from the early Qing, are also of excellent quality.

Carvings
One of the most popular pieces of jade carvings in the museum is the Jadeite Cabbage, a piece of jadeite carved into the shape of a cabbage head, and with a large and a small grasshopper camouflaged in the leaves. The ruffled semi-translucent leaves attached is due to the masterful combination of various natural color of the jade to recreate the color variations of a real cabbage. The Meat-shaped Stone is often exhibited together with the Jadeite Cabbage. A piece of jasper, a form of agate, the strata of which are cleverly used to create a likeness of a piece of pork cooked in soy sauce. The dyed and textured surface makes the layers of skin, lean meat, and fat materialized incredibly lifelike.

Other various carvings of materials such as bamboo, wood, ivory, rhinoceros horn, and fruit pits are exhibited. The Carved Olive-stone Boat is a tiny boat carved from an olive stone. The incredibly fully equipped skilled piece is carved with a covered deck and moveable windows. The interior has chairs, dishes on a table and eight figures representing the characters of Su Shih's Latter Ode on the Red Cliff. The bottom is carved in minute character the entire 300+ character text with the date and the artist's name.

Painting and calligraphy
The paintings in the National Palace Museum date from the Tang dynasty (618–907) to the modern era. The collection covers over one thousand years of Chinese painting, and encompasses a wide range of genres, including landscape, flower and bird, figure painting, boundary painting, etc. Among the most popular paintings in the collection is the Qing Palace Version of Along the River During the Qingming Festival by five Qing dynasty court painters (Chen Mu, Sun Hu, Jin Kun, Dai Hong and Cheng Zhidao). Dwelling in the Fuchun Mountains (Wu-yung version) by Huang Gongwang of the Yuan dynasty is one of the rarest and most dramatic works. Walking on a Mountain Path in Spring is another significant work. The museum has a vast collection of calligraphy works from the hands of major calligraphers, scholars and important courtiers in history. The calligraphy works date from the Jin (266–420) and Tang (618–907) dynasties, with a variety of styles.

Rare books and documents
Rare books in the National Palace Museum range from the Song (960–1279) and Yuan (1271–1368) dynasties to the Ming (1368–1644) and Qing (1644–1912) dynasties, amounting to over 200,000 volumes. Yongle Encyclopedia and Siku Quanshu (Complete Library of the Four Treasuries) are among the examples.

Historical documents in the museum include Jiu Manzhou Dang, a set of Manchu archives that are the sourcebook of Manwen Laodang and a primary source of early Manchu history. Other official documents such as the court archives are available for research in the history of the Qing dynasty.

Gallery

Overseas exhibitions

Due to fears that the artifacts may be impounded and claimed by mainland China due to the controversial political status of Taiwan, the museum does not conduct exhibitions in mainland China. Since the museum's 1965 establishment in Taipei, the National Palace Museum has only made six large overseas exhibitions in countries which have passed laws to prevent judicial seizure of the treasures: the United States in 1996, France in 1998, Germany in 2003, Austria in 2008, Japan in 2014 and Australia in 2019.

The past overseas exhibitions are as follows:
1935: "London International Exhibition of Chinese Art" at the Royal Academy of Arts, London.
1940: "Chinese Art Exhibition" in Moscow, Leningrad.
1961: "Ancient Chinese Art Exhibition" National Gallery of Art in Washington, D.C., New York Metropolitan Museum of Art, Boston Museum of Fine Arts, Museum of Contemporary Art, Chicago, the de Young Museum.
1973: "China Exhibition" in Seoul, South Korea.
1991: "On the Occasion of 1492: the art of the Age of Exploration" at the Washington National Gallery of Art.
1996: "Splendors of Imperial China" at the Metropolitan Museum of Art, Museum of Contemporary Art, Chicago, Asian Art Museum of San Francisco, Washington, D.C. National Gallery of Art exhibition.
1998: "Empire of Memory" at the Grand Palais in Paris exhibition.
1999: National Palace Museum exhibition in Central America.
2000: "Taoism and Chinese art," Museum of Contemporary Art, Chicago and Asian Art Museum of San Francisco.
2003: "Treasures of the Son of Heaven," the old museum in Berlin, Bonn, Federal Art Gallery touring exhibition.
2005: "Museum of World Culture Expo Korea" in Korea.
2005: "The Mongolian Empire – Genghis Khan and his generation" exhibition at the Museum of Anthropology in Munich, Germany.
2006: "magnificent years of the Qing court (1662–1795)" exhibition at the Guimet Museum, France.
2007: "Shanghai – Modern Art" exhibition in Japan.
2008: "Imperial Treasures" in the Kunsthistorisches Museum Vienna exhibition.
2014: "The Treasured Masterpieces from the National Palace Museum, Taipei" in the Tokyo National Museum and Kyushu National Museum.
2019: "Heaven and earth in Chinese art" in the Art Gallery of New South Wales.

Other visitor facilities

Zhishan Garden

It incorporates the principles of such diverse fields as feng shui, Chinese architecture, water management, landscape design, and Chinese folklore and metaphor. It contains numerous ponds, waterworks, and wooden Chinese pavilions. It was completed and opened in 1985. There is also another Chinese Style Garden nearby called the Shuangxi Park and Chinese Garden.

Chang Dai-chien residence
The National Palace Museum also maintains the residence of renowned Chinese painter Chang Dai-chien. The residence, known as the Chang Dai-chien Residence or the Abode of Maya, was constructed in 1976 and completed in 1978. It is a two-story Siheyuan building with Chinese-style gardens occupying approximately 1,911 m2. After Chang's death in 1983, the house and gardens were donated to the National Palace Museum and turned into a museum and memorial.

Directors

Lists of Directors published by the Museum:

Directors of Palace Museum 
 Li Yü-ying (the first appointed Director-General)
 I P'ei-chi (October 1925 – October 1933)
 Ma Heng (October 1933 – August 1949)

Directors of National Central Museum Preparatory Office 

 Fu Ssu-nien (1933–1934)
 Li Chi (1934–1949)

Directors of the Joint Managerial Office of the National Palace Museum and National Central Museum 
In 1949, the Joint Managerial Office of the National Central Museum and National Central Library was established. In 1955, the Joint Managerial Office of the National Palace Museum and National Central Museum was established.

 Hang Li-wu (September 1949 – June 1956)
 K'ung Te-ch'eng (July 1956 – April 1964)
 Ho Lien-k'uei (May 1964 – August 1965)

Directors of National Palace Museum 

 Chiang Fu-ts'ung (September 1965 – January 1983)
 Ch'in Hsiao-yi (January 1983 – May 2000)
 Tu Cheng-sheng (20 May 2000 – 20 May 2004)
 Shih Shou-chien (20 May 2004 – 25 January 2006)
 Lin Mun-lee (25 January 2006 – 20 May 2008)
 Chou Kung-shin (20 May 2008 – 29 July 2012)
 Chou Chu-kun (30 July 2012 – 18 September 2012) (acting)
 Feng Ming-chu (18 September 2012 – 19 May 2016)
 Lin Jeng-yi (20 May 2016 – 15 July 2018)
 Chen Chi-nan (16 July 2018 – 13 January 2019)
 Lee Ching-hui (14 January 2019 – 14 February 2019) (acting)
 Wu Mi-cha (15 February 2019 – 30 January 2023)
 Hsiao Tsung-huang (since 31 January 2023)

See also
 List of most visited art museums
 List of museums in Taipei
 List of museums in Taiwan

Notes

References

External links

 
 Southern Branch of the National Palace Museum official website
 Chiang Dai-chien residence 
Virtual tour of the National Palace Museum provided by Google Arts & Culture

 
Art museums established in 1965
Chinese culture
Museums established in 1964
Palace Museum
Art museums and galleries in Taiwan
Museums in Taipei
Executive Yuan
Asian art museums